Bharat Nirman is an Indian plan for creating basic rural infrastructure. It is a step in bridging the gap between rural and urban areas and improving the quality of lives of rural masses. It comprises projects on irrigation, roads (Pradhan Mantri Gram Sadak Yojana), housing (Indira Awaas Yojana), water supply, electrification and telecommunication connectivity.

The Pradhan Mantri Gram Sadak Yojana (PMGSY) was launched on 25 December, 2000. The primary objective of PMGSY is to provide good quality all-weather roads in all the rural areas where urban-rural road connectivity is found to be very weak. All unconnected habitations with a population of more than 500 persons has been provided connectivity by 2007.

References

External links

Rural development in India
Indian missions
Manmohan Singh administration